The 1994 Junior Pan American Artistic Gymnastics Championships was held in Monterrey, Mexico, September 20–22, 1994.

Medal summary

References

1994 in gymnastics
Pan American Gymnastics Championships
International gymnastics competitions hosted by Mexico
1994 in Mexican sports